A stoptail bridge (sometimes also called a stopbar bridge) used on a solid body electric guitar or archtop guitar is a specialized kind of fixed hard-tail bridge. Hard-tail bridged guitars use different bridges from those guitars fitted with vibrato systems (which are also known as tremolo arms or whammy bars).

Construction and materials 

The stoptail bridge consists of two parts: an adjustable fixed bridge piece, such as a Tune-o-matic and a separate stopbar (or stop bar) tailpiece.

A stopbar tailpiece is, as the name implies, a bar-shaped formed metal piece commonly made of pot metal or zinc alloys although aluminum and brass may be used. Many manufacturers claim that the use of lightweight metals and alloys, such as aluminum, provide a greater transfer of the string's vibrational energy or "resonant quality" to the guitar body since there is less mass to excite. Aluminum was also used in the early examples of stoptail bridges from the 1950s, so it carries the mantle of "vintage" vibe.

The "stop" part comes from the fact that the string ends are held in place or they "stop" inside the bar. The bar is mounted on top of the guitar body usually by means of sturdy threaded metal studs screwed into threaded sleeves embedded into the body of the guitar. The studs and stopbar are located behind the separate bridge piece.

The stopbar can either simply slip onto notches on top of the studs, or be held in place using set screws. One danger to be aware of is that the stopbar can fall out of the notches when changing strings and put a ding in the guitar's finish.  When it is held in place using the screws, it is sometimes referred to as a "locking stopbar". In these designs, the Tune-o-matic bridge section is also usually fastened to its embedded studs by set screws. This fastening of the key components in a stoptail bridge system is claimed to impart more sustain and tone to the guitar's sound.

Function and advantages 

The stopbar has holes drilled into it that allow the guitar strings to be threaded from the rear and out through the front.  The string path then goes over the bridge saddles and the string nut to the machine heads located on the headstock.

The stopbar tailpiece is meant to be adjusted for string tension.  The threaded posts can be lowered or raised to increase or relieve the string tension at pitch. This is an important adjustment especially when changing the gauge of the string set on the guitar.  There are practical limits to this technique: too high and you could bend the posts and the strings won't seat properly into the bridge saddles; too low and the string break will rest on the rear of the bridge, killing sustain and tone. Some players prefer to tighten the stopbar all the way down in an attempt to increase sustain and tone.  This requires a different stringing technique.

Some players, like Duane Allman, deviate from the norm and "top wrap" their strings. This is when the direction of the string path is reversed so that the strings are threaded through the leading edge of the stopbar then come out the rear and wrapped over the top of the stop bar. The advantage is that strings are supposedly easier to bend because of the decreased string break angle. Also, the "nonspeaking" string length is increased, which may have an effect on the strings' harmonic vibration (see sympathetic resonance). The increased tendency for the strings to produce natural harmonics may make techniques such as pinch harmonics easier to accomplish.  This is the same way that a wraparound stoptail bridge is strung.  Regardless of the technique used, the tension provided by tightening the strings to pitch is the only thing keeping the stopbar in place, unless it is a "locking" type.

The supposed advantages of using a stoptail bridge over a tremolo bridge are: greater ability to keep the strings in tune, especially under the duress of hard note-bending; better string path stability and ability to intonate; and, better sustain due to a more direct resonance of the guitar's tonewood excited by the transmission of sound wave energy from the vibrating string. This is not a universally accepted opinion and guitarists will argue over the virtues of stoptail, hard-tail and tremolo bridges probably for as long as they all exist.

Variations 

Gibson Guitar Corporation guitars tend to be most often associated with the stoptail bridge, especially the iconic Gibson Les Paul model, whereas Fender Musical Instruments Corporation guitars are most often thought of as vibrato bridges like the famous Stratocaster model.

Wraparound 

A variant of a stoptail bridge is the "wraparound". Wraparound style bridges are used on less costly models such as the Gibson Melody Maker and on expensive, high-end guitars like PRS Guitars. This style bridge combines the bridge and stopbar into one unit. There are a variety of wraparound bridge designs. They may have individual movable bridge saddles (adjustable stoptail bridges), a fixed compensated saddle similar to an acoustic guitar bridge, or simply a straight stopbar anchored in the bridge position.

Footnote

Bibliography 
 

Guitar bridges